Suddala Ashok Teja (born Gurram Ashok Teja; 4 April 1954) is an Indian poet and lyricist known for his work in Telugu cinema and Telugu literature. He has written lyrics for over 2200 songs. He won the National Film Award for Best Lyrics for the song "Nenu saitam" from Tagore (2004).

Early life
Suddala Ashok Teja was born in Suddala village of Jangaon district, Telangana to Telugu poet Suddala Hanmanthu and his wife Janakamma. Both his parents took part in the Telangana Rebellion, fighting against the Nizam of Hyderabad. He has two brothers and a sister; Prabhakar Teja, Sudhakar Teja and Racha Bharathi.

Career
Ashok Teja worked as a government teacher in Bandalingapur, Medipally and Metpally villages of Karimnagar district before coming into the Telugu film industry. He started writing lyrics ever since he was a child. His nephew Uttej a well known character artiste in Telugu films helped him to get a first chance in films. He became popular after penning the lyrics for the films Osey Ramulamma and Ninne Pelladutha during the years 1996–1997.

He won the National Film Award for Best Lyrics in the year 2003 for his song Nenu Saitham in the movie Tagore (2003), it is based on Sri Sri's 'Nenu Saitham' from Mahaprasthanam. He is the third writer to win this award after Sri Sri for his "Telugu veera levaraa" in Alluri Sitaramaraju and Veturi for his "Raalipoye puvva neeku ragaalenduke" in "Matrudevobhava". He wrote over 2200 songs for 1250 movies and 2500 private songs till 2017.He won SIIMA Award for Best Lyricist (Telugu) in 2018 for Vachinde song from Fidaa (2017).

Personal life
Ashok Teja is married to Nirmala. He has two sons and a daughter.

Filmography

 All songs, Movie name: Aa Aiduguru (2014 film)
 Nijamena, Movie name: Jai Bolo Telangana
 Inumulo Oo Hrudayam Molichene, Movie Name: Robo (Telugu)
 Oo Mara Manishi, Movie Name: Robo (Telugu)
 Oorori Mavayyo, Movie Name: Dongala Bandi
 Nelaku Jarene Chandamama, Movie Name: Dongala Bandi
 Agnigundam, Movie Name: Dhee Ante Dhee
 Yey Mister Ninne, Movie Name: Homam
 Ye Pagale, Movie Name: Homam
 Pedavikidem Kasiro, Movie Name: Homam
 Magaallu Mee Maatalo, Movie Name: Homam
 Katti Naaku Gucchadammo, Movie Name: Homam
 Homam Yuddham, Movie Name: Homam
 Style Style, Movie Name: Aatadista
 Sakhude Sakhude, Movie Name: Naamanasukemayindi
 Ee Madhu Bala, Movie Name: Evarinaina Eduristha
 Vedane, Movie Name: Gauthama Budha
 Yeda Yedalo, Movie Name: Gauthama Budha
 Maisamma, Movie Name: Maisamma IPS
 Asale Chalikala, Movie Name: Mr and Mrs Sailaja Krishna Murthy
 Regumullole, Movie Name: Chandamama
 Kamala Pandu, Movie Name: Veedu Maamulodu Kaadu
 O Bapu Nuvve Ravai, Movie Name: Shankar Dada Zindabad
 Manishiki Yenduku, Movie Name: Himsinche 23va Raju Pulikesi
 Yen Chilako, Movie Name: Toss
 Baava Muripinchana, Movie Name: Bhukailas
 Sommunu, Movie Name: Raju Bhai
 Neekosam Pilla, Movie Name: Raju Bhai
 Lothe Teliyanide, Movie Name: Raju Bhai
 Korameenu, Movie Name: Raju Bhai
 Kantipapa Kasirinda, Movie Name: Raju Bhai
 Guchi Guchi, Movie Name: Raju Bhai
 Evare Nuvvu, Movie Name: Raju Bhai
 Evare Nuvvu Remix, Movie Name: Raju Bhai
 Chalta Chalta, Movie Name: Raju Bhai
 Vaaji Vaaji, Movie Name: Sivaji
 Sahana, Movie Name: Sivaji
 Ra Ra Ante, Movie Name: Atili Sattibabu LKG
 Ee Chali Galullona, Movie Name: Atili Sattibabu LKG
 Yeppudu Chappudu, Movie Name: Manasutho
 Holi Holi, Movie Name: Kushi
 Nunugu Meesala, Movie Name: Kubusum
 Ningikegisinara, Movie Name: Kubusum
 Neeli Megahalalo, Movie Name: Kubusum
 Indrudu Eetakallu, Movie Name: Kubusum
 Aha Allari, Movie Name: Khadgam
 Ye Marugelaraa O Raghava, Movie Name: Kaasi
 Punnami Jabili, Movie Name: Kaasi
 Patchi Venna, Movie Name: Kaasi
 Marugelaraa O Raghava, Movie Name: Kaasi
 Kottu Kottu, Movie Name: Kaasi
 Arere Yemaindo, Movie Name: Kaasi
 Bhama Neetho, Movie Name: Intlo Srimathi Veedhilo Kumari
 Nuvvu Yaadikelthe, Movie Name: Girl Friend
 Bangaaru Kalla.ra, Movie Name: Murari
 Alanati Rama Chandrudu.ra, Movie Name: Murari
 Malli Malli Nito, Movie Name: Dhanush
 Bhaj Dekh, Movie Name: Charminar
 Aagadu, Movie Name: Chalo Assembly
 Mudda Banthi, Movie Name: Ninnu Choodalani
 Sirimalle Puvvalle, Movie Name: Leelamahal Center
 Paramapavana, Movie Name: Leelamahal Center
 Galiki Theliyani, Movie Name: Leelamahal Center
 Chitti Chilakamma, Movie Name: Leelamahal Center
 Balamanemmo, Movie Name: Leelamahal Center
 Oni Merupulu, Movie Name: Madhumasam
 Subhash Chandra Bose, Movie Name: Subash Chandra Bose
 Neredu Pallu, Movie Name: Subash Chandra Bose
 Thittu, Movie Name: Sri Srimati Sathyabhama
 Sathya, Movie Name: Sri Srimati Sathyabhama
 Mera, Movie Name: Sri Srimati Sathyabhama
 Yemandi, Movie Name: Sivani
 Nenemi chetanu, Movie Name: Shiv Shankar
 Krishna nuvvu raaku, Movie Name: Shiv Shankar
 Vagalaadi, Movie Name: Sardukupodam Randi
 Kithaikthalu, Movie Name: Samba
 Vallantha Tullintha, Movie Name: Sakutumba Saparivara Sametam
 Pachi Venna, Movie Name: Sakutumba Saparivara Sametam
 Manasantha Manasupadi, Movie Name: Sakutumba Saparivara Sametam
 Love Is The Feeling Of Life, Movie Name: Sakutumba Saparivara Sametam
 Anda Chandala, Movie Name: Sakutumba Saparivara Sametam
 Tamala paku nemali soku, Movie Name: Dil
 Yudham Yudha, Movie Name: Encounter
 Palle Tellavaarutunnadaa, Movie Name: Encounter
 Ooru Vaada Akkallaaraa, Movie Name: Encounter
 Isdesh, Movie Name: Jenda
 Pada Pada Nee, Movie Name: Jabili
 Jolly Jolly College, Movie Name: Jabili
 Ganga Yamuna Godari, Movie Name: Jabili
 Chiguraku Yevaro, Movie Name: Jabili
 Oka Poovula, Movie Name: Naa Oopiri
 Oka Merupe, Movie Name: Naa Oopiri
 Ammo Ammammo, Movie Name: Satyam Shivam Sundaram
 O_MALLEPUVVURA, Movie Name: Pellam Oorelithe
 Yedura Ledinka, Movie Name: Rayalseema Ramanna Choudary
 Ramanna Ramanna, Movie Name: Rayalseema Ramanna Choudary
 Buchimallu Buchimallu, Movie Name: Rayalseema Ramanna Choudary
 Hey Manasa, Movie Name: Chinnodu
 Chinnari, Movie Name: Chinnodu
 Bangaru Chilaka, Movie Name: Raaraju
 Rampa Chiku, Movie Name: Raana Old
 Uncle Uncle Little Sta, Movie Name: Uncle
 Gitarai Ne Padanaa, Movie Name: Uncle
 Evaru Nuvvu, Movie Name: Vijayaramaraju
 Adugu Aduguna, Movie Name: Vijayaramaraju
 Adigadigo vastunnadu, Movie Name: Veede
 Suryude Selavni, Movie Name: Stalin
 Hayire Hayire, Movie Name: Room Mates
 Hayire Hayire, Movie Name: Room Mates
 Maataltho Swarale, Movie Name: Amma Cheppindi
 Undipo Nesthama, Movie Name: Asthram
 O Hanumanthu, Movie Name: Hanumanthu
 Ramayya Ramayya, Movie Name: Hanumanthu
 Jagadeka Veeruniga, Movie Name: Sri Krishna
 Varevva, Movie Name: Ranam
 Hylessa, Movie Name: Sri Ramadaasu
 Holi Holi, Movie Name: Sree
 Aaku Chaatu Pindelam, Movie Name: Fools
 Jabilipaina, Movie Name: Paandu
 Ninnemo Paaparo, Movie Name: Seenugadu Chiranjeevi Fan
 Chiluka Pada Pada, Movie Name: Chandramukhi
 Andala Aakashamantha, Movie Name: Chandramukhi
 Jimmu Choodu, Movie Name: Ayodhya
 Chodo Chodo, Movie Name: Ayodhya
 Raghavendrudu, Movie Name: Apple
 Paila Pachisu Pilla, Movie Name: Apple
 Nuvva Nuvva, Movie Name: Apple
 Money Money, Movie Name: Apple
 Maa Colonylo, Movie Name: Apple
 Maylu Maylu, Movie Name: Bunny
 Kanapada leda, Movie Name: Bunny
 Kallallo Draksha Rasam, Movie Name: Bobby
 Papa Ro, Movie Name: Vijayendra Varma
 Nee Pere Tanapyna, Movie Name: Vishnu
 Ravoi Chandamama, Movie Name: Vishnu
 Em chesavo, Movie Name: Yagnam
 All songs, Movie Name: 6 Teens
 Toofan Ayi Nuvvu Ravali Ra, Movie Name: Apthudu
 Palle palleku Untavu Kapala, Movie Name: Apthudu
 Kallu Terichi Choosa, Movie Name: Political Rowdy
 Are Pachi Pachiga – Movie Name: Political Rowdy
 Rayala seema Ramanna Chowdary – title song and other songs
 Vishnu – Raavoyi chanda mama
 Yagnam – Tongi Tongi choodamoku chandamama
 Badrachalam – Okate jananam Okate maranam
 Pandurangadu – Matrudevo bhava anna maaata
 Girlfriend – Nuvu Yadikelthe Aadikastha suvarna
 Chandamama – Regumullole
 Kante Koothurne Kanu
 Khadgam  – Aha Allari
 Murari – Bangaaru kalla buchamma
 Tagore – 2003 – Nenu Saitham
  OkaTO number kurraaDu –  Nemali kannodaa
 Osey Ramulamma – 1997 – 6 songs
 Ninne Pelladutha – 1996 – Naa mogudu raampyaari
 Fidaa - 2017 - Vachhinde
 Bevars - 2018 - Talli talli
Falaknuma Das - 2019 - "Paye Paye""
Palasa 1978 - 2020 - "Kalavathi Kalavathi"
Radha Krishna - 2021 - "Nirmala Bomma"
Love Story - 2021 - "Saranga Dariya"
RRR - 2021 - "Komuram bheemudo"
Republic - 2021 - "Jor Se"
Rowdy Boys - 2022 - "Bridhavanam"

References

External links 

 Suddala Ashok Teja interview by Telugucinema.com

Living people
People from Nalgonda
Indian lyricists
Telugu-language lyricists
Telugu writers
Writers from Hyderabad, India
1954 births
Best Lyrics National Film Award winners